The Common shot silverline, Cigaritis ictis, is a species of lycaenid butterflies. It is native to India and Sri Lanka. The Sri Lankan population is classified as a subspecies: Cigaritis ictis ceylonica (Felder, 1868).

Description

Notes and references

Cigaritis
Butterflies of Sri Lanka
Butterflies of Asia